The Poncione Rosso is a mountain of the Lepontine Alps, located in the Swiss canton of Ticino. It lies on the chain separating the valleys of Verzasca and Leventina.

References

External links
Poncinone Rosso on Hikr

Mountains of the Alps
Mountains of Switzerland
Mountains of Ticino
Lepontine Alps